Denali Award may refer to:

Denali Award, the top honor that the Alaska Federation of Natives bestows to non-Natives
Denali Award, the highest award in Varsity Scouting
Denali Award, one form of the Alaskan of the Year awards